Michael O'Brien (July 24, 1954 – October 15, 2018) was an American politician who was a member of Democratic Party in Pennsylvania House of Representatives, representing the 175th legislative district. He was first elected in 2006.

The district he served contained such Philadelphia landmarks as Independence Hall (United States), the Liberty Bell, South Street, and Penn Treaty Park. O'Brien attended Northeast Catholic High School for Boys and La Salle University.

Prior to elective office, he served as chief of staff to Marie Lederer.

O'Brien suffered a fatal heart attack on October 15, 2018.

References

External links
Pennsylvania House of Representatives - Michael H. O'Brien official PA House website
Pennsylvania House Democratic Caucus - Rep. Michael H. O'Brien official Party website

Follow the Money - Michael H. O'Brien
2006 campaign contributions

Democratic Party members of the Pennsylvania House of Representatives
1954 births
2018 deaths
Politicians from Philadelphia
La Salle University alumni
21st-century American politicians